Events in the year 1905 in Iceland.

Incumbents 
 Monarch: Christian IX
 Prime Minister: Hannes Þórður Pétursson Hafstein

Events 

 Verzló, now the oldest oldest private school in Iceland, is founded.
 The National Court is founded.

References 

 
1900s in Iceland
Years of the 20th century in Iceland
Iceland
Iceland